HitRecord on TV is a 2014 American television variety series created by Joseph Gordon-Levitt with executive producers Jared Geller, Brian Graden, and Belisa Balaban. The series premiered on 18 January 2014 on Pivot in the United States. The series emphasizes Internet celebrity in art history by focusing on different themes. The satellite variety show aired new episodes five consecutive nights a week (every day except Thursday and Friday on which reruns are aired instead) after prime time and before late night for Pivot on Verizon FIOS, AT&T U-verse, DirecTV, Charter Spectrum, and Dish. The show is supported by TakePart.

The first three episodes were shown at 2014 Sundance Film Festival on January 18, 2014.

Development
Based on hitRECord's open-collaborative approach to production, hitRECord on TV was developed as a variety show starring, created, and directed by Joseph Gordon-Levitt. Described as the online community's biggest collaborative project to date, hitRECord on TV was made from contributions from members of the hitRECord community around the world. The program was developed around featuring specific themes per episode, with requests from the community directors to provide and refine content for each theme. The final product for each episode features short films, live performances, cartoons and much more.

The first episode, "RE: Number 1", premiered on Pivot on January 18, 2014 at 10PM, and was made available for online viewing. In January 2014, Pivot announced the renewal of the series for a second season.

Series overview

Episodes
The first season of hitRecord on TV premiered on January 18, 2014, and consisted of eight episodes.  In 2014, the series was nominated and won an Emmy Award for Outstanding Creative Achievement in Interactive Media in the area of Social TV.  The entire season was released as a box set which includes a digital download and themed booklets for each episode, as well as supplementary and bonus material.

Season 1

Season 2
The second season of hitRECORD on TV was premiered on June 12, 2015 on Pivot.  As with the first season, the second season will consist of eight episodes each focusing on a specific theme.  The first episode of the season, "RE: THE DARK", was available for online viewing before the season's premiere on Pivot on June 12, 2015.  The fifth episode, "RE: GUNS", considered the most controversial theme for the season, also became available for online viewing shortly before the episode aired on Pivot on July 10, 2015.

References

External links
Pivot official website

Pivot (TV network) original programming
2009 web series debuts
2014 American television series debuts
2010s American variety television series
2020s American variety television series